Kala Suraj is a 1985 Hindi action film starring Shatrughan Sinha, Sulakshana Pandit, and Rakesh Roshan. The film is best known for its song "do ghoot pila de" which is still popular among new generation.

Cast
 Shatrughan Sinha as Karan
 Sulakshana Pandit as Karuna
 Rakesh Roshan as Police Officer Pratap Singh
 Aruna Irani
 Amjad Khan

Soundtrack
The music of the film was composed by Bappi Lahiri and the lyrics were penned by Kulwant Jani.

"Aap Kya Aaye Lo Bahaar Aa Gayee" - Sharon Prabhakar
"Ang Ang Mera Gaane Laga" - Asha Bhosle
"Apni Baahon Ka Haar De" - Sulakshana Pandit, K. J. Yesudas
"Do Ghoont Pila De Saqi" - Narendra Chanchal
"Peenewale Tujhe" - Shankar-Shambhu (composed by Shankar-Shambhu)
"Pinjrewali Munia"  Manna Dey (composed by Shankar–Jaikishan and penned by Shailendra)

References

External links
 

1985 films
Films scored by Bappi Lahiri
1980s Hindi-language films
Films scored by Shankar–Shambhu
Films scored by Shankar–Jaikishan